Kathy Rinaldi-Stunkel (born March 24, 1967) is a former professional American tennis player, who retired in September 1997. In her career, she won three singles and two doubles titles on the WTA Tour, and reached the semifinals of the 1985 Wimbledon Championships.

Career
Rinaldi reached her highest career ranking on May 26, 1986, when she was ranked world No. 7. The recipient of WTA Most Impressive Newcomer Award in 1981 and WTA Comeback Player of the Year Award in 1989, she had career wins over top players such as Steffi Graf, Jana Novotná, Sue Barker, Pam Shriver, Hana Mandlíková, Wendy Turnbull, Manuela Maleeva, Dianne Fromholtz, Helena Suková, Claudia Kohde-Kilsch, Zina Garrison, Sylvia Hanika, Kathy Jordan, Jo Durie, and Natasha Zvereva.

Rinaldi was the youngest player to win a match at Wimbledon (14 years, 91 days)  in 1981, a record that stood until 1990. After the 1987 French Open, she suffered a freak injury in Monte Carlo, slipping on stairs, and in trying to catch herself, fracturing her right thumb.  This injury sidelined her for rest of the year. She was a member of the US Wightman Cup Team in 1983, 1985, and 1986.

Fed Cup
In December 2016, Rinaldi was appointed as the captain of the United States Fed Cup team, succeeding Mary Joe Fernandez. In her first year as Fed Cup captain, the U.S. won the 2017 Fed Cup.

Family

Rinaldi married Brad Stunkel, her high school sweetheart, on December 11, 1993, and adopted his surname. She gave birth to a son, Bradley Benton Stunkel Jr., on February 8, 1995. The family currently resides in Palm City, Florida.

Awards and recognitions
 1981: WTA Most Impressive Newcomer of the Year
 1989: WTA Comeback of the Year

WTA career finals

Singles: 7 (3–4)

Doubles: 12 (2–10)

Grand Slam singles performance timeline

References

External links
 
 

1967 births
Living people
American female tennis players
American people of Italian descent
People from Palm City, Florida
Tennis people from Florida
21st-century American women